The High Tatras or High Tatra Mountains (Slovak: Vysoké Tatry; ;  , Vysoki Tatry; ;), are a mountain range along the border of northern Slovakia in the Prešov Region, and southern Poland in the Lesser Poland Voivodeship. They are a range of the Tatra Mountains chain.

Description 

The mountain range borders the Belianske Tatras to the east, the Podtatranská kotlina to the south, and the Western Tatras to the west. Most of the range, and all the highest peaks, are in Slovakia.

Biogeography
The High Tatras, having 29 peaks over  AMSL are, with the Southern Carpathians, the only mountain ranges with an alpine character and habitats in the entire  length of the Carpathian Mountains system.
The first European cross-border national park, Tatra National Park, was founded here with Tatra National Park (Tatranský národný park) in Slovakia in 1948, and Tatra National Park (Tatrzański Park Narodowy) in Poland in 1954. The contiguous parks protect UNESCO's trans-border Tatra biosphere reserve.
Fauna
Many rare and endemic animals and plant species are native to the High Tatras. They include the Tatras' endemic goat-antelope and critically endangered species, the Tatra chamois (Rupicapra rupicapra tatrica). Predators include Eurasian brown bear, Eurasian lynx, marten, wolf and fox. The Alpine marmot is common in the range.
Flora
Flora of the High Tatras includes: the endemic Tatra scurvy-grass (Cochlearia tatrae), yellow mountain saxifrage (Saxifraga aizoides), ground covering net-leaved willow (Salix reticulata), Norway spruce (Picea abies), Swiss pine (Pinus cembra), and European larch (Larix decidua).

Peaks

Highest peaks

The 15 highest peaks of the High Tatras—all located in Slovakia—are:

Other notable peaks
 Kriváň, 2494 meters, also called Slovakia's "most beautiful mountain"
 Rysy, the popular Polish−Slovak summit border crossing.  Rysy has three peaks:  the middle at 2,503 meters; the north-western at 2,499 meters; and the south-eastern at 2,473 meters. The north-western peak is the highest point of Poland.
 Slavkovský štít, 2452 meters tall, within the Tatra National Park, Slovakia

Mountain lakes

Major lakes
 Slovak lakes
 Štrbské pleso - 1,347 m, 20 m deep.
 Popradské pleso - 1,494 m, 17 m deep.
 Veľké Hincovo pleso - 1,945 m, 54 m deep.
 Polish lakes
 Morskie Oko - 1,395 m, 51 m deep.
 Czarny Staw pod Rysami - 1,583 m, 76 m deep.
 Wielki Staw Polski - 1,664 m, 79 m deep.

Other lakes
 Slovak lakes
 Zmrzlé pleso
 Ťažké pleso
 Ľadové pleso
 Batizovské pleso
 Veľké Spišské pleso - 2,019 m, 10 m deep.
 Veľké Žabie pleso (Mengusovské) - 1,921 m, 7 m deep
 Vyšné Bielovodské Žabie pleso - 1,699 m, 25 m deep.
 Nižné Bielovodské Žabie pleso - 1,675 m, 21 m deep.
 Polish lakes
 Czarny Staw Gąsienicowy - 1,624 m, 51 m deep.

Transport 
 By TEŽ
 Line : from: Štrbské Pleso - to: Poprad-Tatry
 Line : from: Starý Smokovec - to: Tatranská Lomnica
 By OŽ
 Line : from: Štrbské Pleso - to: Štrba
 By ŽSR
 Line : from: Tatranská Lomnica - to: Studený Potok or from: Poprad-Tatry - to: Plaveč

Culture

The area is well known for winter sports. Ski resorts include Štrbské pleso, Starý Smokovec and Tatranská Lomnica in Slovakia, and Zakopane in Poland. The town of Poprad is the gateway to the Slovak Tatra resorts.

People
The Górale people ("highlanders"), a group of indigenous people with a distinctive traditional culture, are of the High Tatras and other mountain ranges and valleys in the Tatra Mountains region.

Ludwig Greiner identified Gerlachovský štít (Gerlachovský Peak) as the highest summit of the Tatra Mountains, and the entire Carpathian Mountains system. It is also the highest point of Slovakia.

Places and services
Vysoké Tatry (town)
Orla Perć — tourist mountain path/trail.
Tatra Volunteer Search and Rescue (Poland)
Mountain Rescue Service (Slovakia)

See also
Tatra National Park, Poland
Tatra National Park, Slovakia
Tourism in Poland
Tourism in Slovakia
1989 Tatry - named after High Tatras

References

"The Tatras: High, Western, Bela's" (1:50,000 hiking map); BBKart/Marco Polo; 2005.

External links

UNESCO — Natural Reserves of Tatras Mountains
 Tatry.org: Tatry Open Directory
 Tatry.sk: Official town of High Tatry website
 TldTatry.sk: Tatra Cable Railways
 Summitpost.org: High Tatra Mountains
 High Tatra Mountains visualized in 3D
 3D scan of Lomnický peak, one of the highest mountain peaks in the High Tatras mountains.

Images
 VysokeTatry.com— various maps of the High Tatras
  Butkaj.com: photos of villages in the High Tatras — after the 2004 storm calamity.

 
.
Tatras, High
Tatras, High
Tatras, High
Tatras, High
Tatras, High
Tatras, High
Tatra Mountains